Sir Harry Nuttall, 4th Baronet (born 2 January 1963) is a British sports marketing entrepreneur providing commercial consultancy advising agencies, brands and rights holders. 25 years’ experience in the motorsport space, from grass roots to Formula One. Currently senior advisor to Mercedes AMG Petronas Formula One Team.

Previous roles

2009-12 Caterham F1 Team - Responsible for all commercial aspects of the team formerly known as Lotus Racing/Team Lotus: from successful entry candidacy to livery, brand, commercial and marketing staff recruitment and all sponsorship and technical partner acquisitions: GE, Dell, Intel, Renault, Pirelli, APC, CNN, Visa, Maxis, Proton, DuPont, LG, Hackett.

2008-09 Brawn GP Formula One Team - Contracted by management following Honda’s withdrawal in December 2008 to assist in the sourcing of investors and sponsors. Brawn GP won both the 2009 Constructors and Drivers F1 World Championships, concluded a successful sale to Daimler AG and a rebrand to Mercedes GP Petronas Formula One team.

2004-07 Intel Corporation - Retained by Intel to advise on opportunities within the FIA Formula One World Championship coincident with their rebrand.  Intel became a Premium Partner to the BMW Sauber F1 Team and a local race partner to Formula One Management during the 2005, 2006 and 2007 seasons.

1998-03 Arrows F1 Team - Retained by TWR to work on various motorsports and circuit development programmes. Delivered primary sponsorship from UPC (United Pan-Europe Communications) under their Chello Broadband brand for Arrows F1 Team.

1989-1997 Racing Career - Competed in Formula Ford (1989) and Formula Renault (1992 UK (3rd) and European Championships (4th); 1 win, 2 pole positions & 8 podiums); the RAC British Touring Car Championship (1993) and BPR Global Endurance GT Series (1994 Champion with Porsche; 4 wins, 8 podiums). 
Elected to British Racing Driver’s Club in 1994 and Vice Champion in ’94 BRDC Gold Star Award. Test & Development Driver, Lamborghini Jota Project (1995/6). Career sponsors included: Camel, Mobil, BP, Texaco, Hawaiian Tropic & Grundig.

Brown Brothers Harriman & Co.	//Associate - Admitted to BBH & Co training programme in New York. Registered Representative NYSE. Associate with sales team in London marketing US products to Scandinavian institutions. Broker of the Year, 1988.

Racing record

Complete British Touring Car Championship results
(key) (Races in bold indicate pole position) (Races in italics indicate fastest lap)

Education
1982-1985	The American University, Washington DC, USA.	
1976-1981	Eton College, Windsor, UK.

Personal
Nuttall is the son of Sir Nicholas Nuttall by his first wife, Rosemary Caroline York (1934–2007), the daughter of Christopher York. He had one sister, Tamara Nuttall (1967–1997).

Married with two children, he inherited the Nuttall baronetcy in 2007 on the death of his father.

References

1963 births
Baronets in the Baronetage of the United Kingdom
English racing drivers
British Formula Renault 2.0 drivers
British Touring Car Championship drivers
People educated at Eton College
Living people
Place of birth missing (living people)
Harry
Ecurie Ecosse drivers